Capital Cities may refer to:

Capital Cities Communications, (sometimes referred to as "CapCities" or "Capital Cities") was an American media company best known for its surprise purchase of the much larger American Broadcasting Company in 1985 and became Capital Cities/ABC Inc (See American Broadcasting Company). Its successor is Walt Disney Television, a unit of the Walt Disney Company, which purchased CapCities in 1996
Capital city, the seat of a government
Capital Cities (band), American indie pop duo